Anuj Kumar Chaudhary (born 5 August 1980; also known as Anuj Chaudhry) is a retired amateur Indian freestyle wrestler, who competed in the men's light heavyweight category. He achieved top ten finishes in the 74-kg division at the Asian Games (2002 and 2006), scored two silver medals at the Commonwealth Games (2002 and 2010) and two bronze at the Asian Wrestling Championships, and also represented his nation India at the 2004 Summer Olympics. Before his sporting career ended in 2010, Kumar trained at Guru Hanuman Akhara.

Kumar reached sporting headlines at the 2002 Commonwealth Games in Manchester, England, where he claimed a silver medal in the 84-kg division, losing out to Canada's Nicholas Ugoalah by a tough 4–1 verdict. On that same year, he competed for the Indian wrestling team at the Asian Games in Busan, South Korea, but left the tournament empty-handed and injured.

At the 2004 Summer Olympics in Athens, Kumar qualified for his first Indian squad in the men's 84 kg class. Earlier in the process, he placed third and guaranteed a spot on the Indian wrestling team from the Olympic Qualification Tournament in Sofia, Bulgaria. He lost two straight matches each to Iran's Majid Khodaei (1–5) and Japan's Hidekazu Yokoyama (5–11), leaving him on the bottom of the prelim pool and placing sixteenth in the final standings.

Shortly after the Games, Kumar ended his medal drought by picking up a bronze at the 2005 Asian Wrestling Championships in Wuhan, China, and continued to repeat the same outcome in Pattaya, Thailand four years later. He also sought his bid to compete for the 2008 Summer Olympics in Beijing, but failed to attain the bid from the Olympic Tournament.

When India hosted the 2010 Commonwealth Games in his native New Delhi, Kumar lost his final match to neighboring Pakistan's Muhammad Inam by a 4–3 decision, and received a silver medal with his home crowd inside Indira Gandhi Arena. Following another medal record, Kumar retired from competitive wrestling career to focus on his personal life.

Currently, he is serving as Deputy Superintendent (DSP) in UP Police.

References

External links
Profile – International Wrestling Database

1980 births
Living people
Indian male sport wrestlers
Olympic wrestlers of India
Wrestlers at the 2004 Summer Olympics
Wrestlers at the 2002 Asian Games
Wrestlers at the 2006 Asian Games
Wrestlers at the 2002 Commonwealth Games
Wrestlers at the 2010 Commonwealth Games
Commonwealth Games silver medallists for India
Sport wrestlers from Uttar Pradesh
Commonwealth Games medallists in wrestling
Asian Games competitors for India
People from Muzaffarnagar district
Recipients of the Arjuna Award
21st-century Indian people
Medallists at the 2002 Commonwealth Games
Medallists at the 2010 Commonwealth Games